Tritonibacter is a Gram-negative, heterotrophic and aerobic genus of bacteria from the family of Rhodobacteraceae with one known species (Tritonibacter horizontis). Tritonibacter horizontis has been isolated from oil contaminated water from the Deepwater Horizon oil spill in the Gulf of Mexico.

References

Rhodobacteraceae
Bacteria genera
Monotypic bacteria genera